Harold Pearson may refer to:

Harold Pearson (footballer, born 1901) (1901–1972), English footballer with Southampton and Coventry City
Harold Pearson (footballer, born 1908) (1908–1994), English football goalkeeper with West Bromwich Albion
Harold Pearson, 2nd Viscount Cowdray (1882–1933), British peer and Liberal Party politician

See also
Harry Pearson (disambiguation)
Henry Harold Welch Pearson (1870–1916), South African botanist